The Andrews-Moore House is a historic plantation house located near Bunn, Franklin County, North Carolina.

The house was built by tobacco farmer William Andrews (??-1890) to be the home for his wife, daughter and himself. It was erected in two sections about 1780 and 1830, and was a large -story, Georgian-style timber frame dwelling with a one-story rear ell. It features two exquisite double paved-shouldered chimneys.

It was listed on the National Register of Historic Places in 1998. After a recent restoration, the house caught on fire on March 29, 2006, destroying much of the building. The house was sold in 2010 to new owners, who launched a restoration effort.

References

Plantation houses in North Carolina
Houses on the National Register of Historic Places in North Carolina
Houses completed in 1830
Georgian architecture in North Carolina
Federal architecture in North Carolina
Greek Revival houses in North Carolina
Houses in Franklin County, North Carolina
National Register of Historic Places in Franklin County, North Carolina
1830 establishments in North Carolina
Burned houses in the United States
History of slavery in North Carolina